The University of Melbourne Student Union (UMSU) is one of two student organisations at the University of Melbourne, Australia. UMSU, incorporated as University of Melbourne Student Union, Inc. (UMSU) provides representation and services for all current students and the University of Melbourne.

Following the liquidation of its predecessor, The Melbourne University Student Union (MUSU), UMSU was incorporated on 17 November 2005, following approval by the Council of the University of Melbourne in October of that year. Its first elections were held in October 2005 under the transitional clauses of the constitution.

Culture 
There is a long history of student activities at the University of Melbourne. The Union Band Comp has kick-started the careers of several well-known Australian bands, and an annual comedy review once produced the Working Dog crew. Several Members of Parliament were active within the MUSU, including Sir Robert Menzies (former Australian Prime Minister), Lindsay Tanner (Member for Melbourne) and Sophie Mirabella (Former Member for Indi).

Theatres

The Union Theatre, also known as the Union House Theatre, was founded around 1953, along with the Union Theatre Repertory Company. A large number of notable Australian performers, writers and other notable people did some of their earliest work there, including  Cate Blanchett, Barry Humphries, Steve Vizard, Barrie Kosky, Graeme Blundell, and Germaine Greer. It is on the ground floor of the Student Union.

The Guild Theatre is on Level 1.

Student clubs and Societies 

Over 200 student-run clubs and societies are affiliated to UMSU, which supports these organisations though financial grants and administrative assistance. The groups affiliated with UMSU range from the Fotoholics - Photography Club to the Pirates, but the largest and most notable of these societies are the faculty clubs (Arts' Students Society & Science Students' Society) which have the largest balls and parties on campus.

Theatre clubs 

Union House Theatre is the facilitator of student theatre at the Parkville campus, and runs two theatre spaces available for use by student theatre groups. Student theatre groups include the Melbourne University Absurdist Theatre Society (MUATS), the University of Melbourne Music Theatre Association (UMMTA), the Throwback Players and the Union Players, as well as groups for the Colleges. Faculty theatre clubs include the Law and Medical Revues. Theatre clubs from culturally diverse backgrounds include Chinese and Sri Lankan theatre groups.

Faculty clubs
There are seven notable faculty clubs at the University of Melbourne: The Melbourne Arts Students' Society, The Science Students' Society, The Engineering Students' Club, The Commerce Students' Society, The Biomedicine Students' Society, The Environments Students' Society (ENVi), and the Music Students' Society (MSS). All clubs run events throughout the year aimed at integrating new students into university life, running social activities and liaising between the faculties and the current students to enable and encourage their studies and enable opportunities for future employment.

Political clubs

Political clubs in 2020 include Melbourne International Relations Society (MIRS) Liberals, the ALP Club (Labor Left), Labor (Labor Right), Greens, Socialist Alternative and Solidarity, as well as clubs representing Amnesty International and the Political Interest Society.

A number of activist campaign groups are affiliated to the student union, including the Campus Refugee Rights Club and the Australian Youth Climate Coalition.

Cultural and linguistic clubs 
As of 2020, there are 42 cultural and linguistic clubs. Out of those, there are 26 Asian cultural and linguistic clubs, 6 Middle Eastern cultural and linguistic clubs, 6 European cultural and linguistic clubs, 1 African club and 3 broader cultural and linguistic clubs.

Debating society
The Melbourne University Debating Society is one of Victoria's oldest student organisations, founded in 1876. MUDS holds weekly debating competitions, as well as larger annual invitational competitions for other universities in the lead-up to the World Universities Debating Championships, and the Australasian Intervarsity Debating Championships. Historically, the University of Melbourne has been very successful, hosting the 1993 World Universities Debating Championship, and making it to the Grand Final of the 2003 WUDC. Additionally, MUDS were the champions of the 2019 Australasian Intervarsity Debating Championships. The Society also hosts Public Debates, and is one of the largest student groups on campus.

Special Interest 
As of 2021, there are 35 special interest clubs including Unimelb Love Letters and the Bullet Journal and Stationery Club.

Funding 

The student union had been funded by compulsory Amenities and Services Fees since 1911. The introduction of VSU  saw a significant loss of funding for the union, as the ASF was no longer charged from 1 July 2006. On 11 October 2011 the SSAF was introduced which led to a large increase in funding to the Union, though not as high as in the pre-VSU era. In 2014 the Union was allocated just under $4.5 Million by the University, or 34% of the total SSAF revenue collected.

The union funds a range of services including: the Rowden White library; the Student Union Advocacy and Legal Service; the campus information centre; the Union House Theater, Clubs and Societies, Farrago, Student Representation and common areas in Union House. This allocation also covers staff salaries, and office bearer honorariums. UMSU additionally collects a small amount of revenue from event ticket sales, AV and BBQ hire, sponsorship and other sources.

History 

The University of Melbourne Union was founded in 1884 to promote the common interests of students and assist in social interactions between its members.  The Melbourne University Students’ Representative Council was formed as an independent unincorporated association at a special general meeting called by the Sports Union Council on 19 September 1907.

The Associations Incorporation Act (1981) allowed incorporation of student bodies, among others. The Students’ Association in 1987 as the Melbourne College of Advanced Education Students’ Association-Carlton Incorporated, and the Students’ Representative Council was incorporated in 1988 as Melbourne University Students’ Representative Council Incorporated.  In October 1988 the two merged to form Melbourne University Student Union Incorporated (MUSUi).

Relocation to New Student Precinct 
After over 100 years in Union House, UMSU was relocated to the New Student Precinct in 2022. UMSU is now housed across neighbouring buildings in the Precinct, with most of the organisation residing in Building 168 (formerly Doug McDonell Building). Union House Theatre and George Paton Gallery are now located in the Arts & Cultural Building, while the Rowden White Library can be found in the Student Pavilion.

Voluntary liquidation 
From 2002, some of the union's unprofitable commercial services were terminated, including U-Bar, and a property deal was entered into with Optima Property Development Group.  A draft report from auditor PricewaterhouseCoopers warned in June 2003 that this could potentially create obligations beyond MUSUi's capacity to pay. The deal was for MUSUi to sublease student apartments to international students from the Optima Group. It did not proceed.

On 30 September 2003, Vice-Chancellor Alan Gilbert informed MUSUi that the University was terminating the 2003 Funding Agreement, effectively stripping it of any future money, citing "evidence of breaches by MUSUI of its obligations under the Agreement", (the agreement being "providing facilities, services or activities of direct benefit to students at the institution").  He also cited a "serious breakdown in governance, financial management and accountability structures within MUSU".

On 6 February 2004, the Union was placed into liquidation by the Supreme Court of Victoria after a vote by the Student Union Executive. MUSU's liquidator, Dean Royston McVeigh,  said in his provisional liquidator's report, that the Union owed debts of $4.3 million (mainly to the University of Melbourne) but only had assets of $3.5 million.  McVeigh acknowledged that these "debts" were the result of creative accounting by the University, with the University ultimately relinquishing any claim to such "debts". As a result, it was no longer student-controlled (a prerequisite for affiliation to NUS) and was in any case unable to pay affiliation fees. A new constitution was approved.

Master Ewart Evans, who was presiding over the hearings of the liquidators' examination until his retirement in 2005, was critical of the "somewhat precipitative" timing of civil court proceedings, which McVeigh quickly settled out of court after much adverse publicity about his own fees and expenses believed to total more than $8 million prior to producing a Liquidator's Report and convening a meeting of creditors. The downfall of MUSU was satirised by the Union Players in the play Friday Night at the Union in 2004.

Recent political history 

Following the 2004 annual election, a coalition between the Liberal Club and the Labor right was defeated by a cooperative left, made up of National Labor Students (ALP Club), Socialist Alternative and a group of progressive students who are not involved in other politics called Activate. The positions won by the left groups were for an interim student representative committee established by the University to oversee student representation and advocacy until the incorporation of UMSU.

UMSU saw few changes in its power dynamic from 2005-07. In 2007 National Labor Students held the President, Secretary and Education (Academic) Offices. The makeup of the 2007 Student Council had no ALSF presence (due to the Liberal Student tickets withdrawing from the annual elections prior to the opening of the ballot). The 2007 UMSU budget, due to funding cuts caused by VSU, was reduced from just over $2m in 2006 to $1.23m in 2007. This resulted in reductions in funding for departments, particularly those which traditionally have been considered high, such as the Activities, Clubs and Societies and Media Departments.

In 2008, the National Labor Students and Grassroots tickets, running as StandUp! and Activate respectively, won most of the paid positions in the Student Union. Their tenure in 2009 was highlighted by difficulties in passing budgetary support towards the National Union of Students and Students for Palestine organizations.

2009 saw nearly all major elected positions won by a Labor Right-Liberal coalition called Synergy. On Student Council, Synergy were elected to four positions (two Liberals and two Student Unity) and five positions were won by iUnion, a newly established ticket run by international students and former StandUp! office bearers.

2012 saw the union criticised for the decision to not lay a $200 wreath at the ANZAC dawn service, with President Mark Kettle stating that "participating in the ANZAC Day service would be ‘glorifying war’". There was also a publication in a major daily newspaper that student resources had been were used to support "a live and extreme sex show performed on campus for "sex education" purposes."

2013 again saw the union criticised, when they passed a motion to unreservedly celebrate the death of Margaret Thatcher, resulting in media coverage from the Herald Sun and a large student backlash against the union over Facebook.

Presidents

Affiliation to NUS 
UMSU is an affiliate to Australia's peak representative body for students, the National Union of Students (NUS). With the University of Melbourne having over 30,000 students of an Equivalent full-time student load (EFTSL), UMSU is the largest union to affiliate to NUS. Due to this, at the yearly National Conference of NUS in December, UMSU is the most represented student organisation. UMSU holds 7 delegate positions, and a grand total of 182 votes on conference floor. The election of NUS Delegates is undertaken during the general elections in early September of each year.

Initial constitution 
The Constitution of UMSU was drafted by a Student Representative Working Group, members of whom were elected in 2004 by electronic ballot; the University Secretary was appointed Returning Officer. The University was closely involved in the drafting process and provided free legal advice to the Working Group.

These student Working Group members consisted of both undergraduate and post-graduate members, and the overall composition of the Working Group was factionally diverse, with the incumbent Student Unity/ALSF coalition being reduced to opposition status. Due to a large number of inquorate meetings, the Working Group instituted a drop-off rule.

The Working Group persisted until mid-2005, when the final draft of the Constitution was presented to the Council of the University. In September 1052 out of 1240 students voted in favour of accepting the new constitution.

The Constitution itself was largely based on the MUSU Constitution, with a number of innovations, including affirmative action provisions, pay-parity and strict accountability mechanisms curbing the powers of the President and Secretary in particular. It also created the Clubs & Societies Department (which in the past had been a part of the Activities Department) and the Indigenous Department.

Paid officers 
UMSU has a number of paid officers, which include: the President; the General Secretary; Media Officers; Education (Academic Affairs) Officer; Education (Public Affairs) Officers; Activities Officers; Creative Arts Officers; Clubs and Societies Officers; Welfare Officer; Environment Officers; Indigenous Officers; Disabilities Officers; Queer Officers; Women's Officers; People of Colour Officers; the Burnley Campus Coordinator; the Southbank Campus Coordinators; the Southbank Activities Officer, and the Southbank Education Officer.

Aside from the positions of President, General Secretary, the campus coordinator of Burnley, the Southbank Activities Officer and the Southbank Education officer, all other offices can be shared between two people. The Media Office must be shared between three or four people.

UMSU has a pay parity provision in its constitution which stipulates that all full-time officers must be paid an equal wage and that all part-time officers be paid at a .6 fraction of the full-time rate of pay. The Burnley Campus Coordinator is paid at .5 fraction of the full-time rate of pay and the Southbank Activities and Southbank Education Officers are paid at .6 fraction of the full-time rate of pay.

Elections and current factions

Elections 
Elections for positions within UMSU are determined through direct election during the first week of September each year. This sees the election of 32 paid office bearers of 17 representative departments, as well as 21 students who sit on UMSU's peak decision body, Students Council. The election of representatives onto department committees and seven NUS delegates also occurs at this time, with the election of a student representative onto the University's Council occurring every two years.

As of the 2016 election, the UMSU constitution has applied Affirmative Action to the election of positions held by more than one representative. This mandates that in all Office Bearer positions, at least 50% of elected representatives must identify as a woman, with the Women's Department having to elect at least one officer that identifies as a Woman of Colour. This is extended to Students Council and department committees, which must elect women into 50%+1 of all positions. In the election of roles within autonomous departments, as well as the election of restricted autonomous positions on Students Council, only those who identify with the represented group are eligible to run.

Factions 
In 2021/22 the Students' Council, the peak body for the union, is made up of 22 student representatives from 6 factions (who run under the following Tickets during elections).

Currently, most of the positions within UMSU are held by members of six factions who run under the tickets Stand Up!, Community for UMSU, Independent Media, and The Biggest Blackest Ticket. As of the 2021 election, Community for UMSU and Stand Up! hold an equal number of offices within UMSU, with Community for UMSU holding a majority within students' council.

 Stand Up! - A progressive ticket consisting mainly of those aligned with the Labor Left faction of the Australian Labor Party who align to the National Labor Students faction of the National Union of Students. Since 2019, this ticket has included students from the Young Labor Centre Unity faction. 
 Community for UMSU - A ticket created in 2020 that emphasises a 'grassroots movement' of students from the university and its community.  Many of the convenors and members of the ticket have hailed from student political entities such as Pride in [Y]our Collective, More!, UMSU International and Student Unity. Since 2020, this ticket has included students from the Labor Right Young Labor Unity (SDA) and Grassroots Independents factions. 
 Independents for Student Democracy - A ticket created in 2019 that runs on the platform of promoting democracy and helping students engage with elections. 
 Independent Media - A ticket that encompasses around the collective of student media on campus, namely the campus newspaper, Farrago and its radio subsidiary, Radio Fodder. For much of recent campus political history, Independent Media has secured the editorship of Farrago. While the preselection process is closed, candidates are preselected internally by members of the media collective who have contributed regularly over the year. 
 UniMob - An Indigenous ticket that is almost wholly built out of the campus' Indigenous collective. 
 Socialist Alternative - A part of a national revolutionary socialist group, at a youth level Socialist Alternative is a Trotskyist faction heavily involved within the National Union of Students. While mainly running under the Left Focus (and more recently, the Melbourne Socialists in 2018) tickets, the group is also known to run 'feeder' split tickets under the guise of one issue ticket names such as Cheaper Textbooks, International Students Welcome or Extend The Free Tram Zone. In 2021, the ticket renamed to 'Left Action'. 
 VVholesome - A joke ticket run by a single person. Created in 2019, the ticket ran for all positions with the same 1-2 people for every positions have recorded a substantial amount of vote share in its contests for a satirical entity. The ticket's aim is to voice its dissatisfication with the union and its politics.

Notable associations 
Several Members of Parliament were active within Melbourne University student life, including Sir Robert Menzies (former Australian Prime Minister), Gareth Evans (former Australian Foreign Minister), Lindsay Tanner (former Member for Melbourne), Michael Danby (former Member for Melbourne Ports), Richard Marles (Deputy Prime Minister of Australia), Alan Tudge (Member for Aston), and Sophie Mirabella (former Member for Indi).

Notable past presidents include:
 Robert Menzies (1916-17)
 Evan Thornley (1987)
 Richard Marles (1988)
 Andrew Landeryou (1991)
 Alan Tudge (1991)

External links 
University of Melbourne Student Union Website

References 

Students' unions in Australia
University of Melbourne
Organizations established in 1884
1884 establishments in Australia
Culture of Melbourne